New Aberdeen may refer to:

 New Aberdeen, part of the City of Aberdeen, Scotland.
 New Aberdeen, Nova Scotia

See also
 New Aberdeen Stadium, a proposed sports stadium in Aberdeen, Scotland